Union Point is a city in Greene County, Georgia, United States. As of the 2020 census, the city population was 1,597.

History
Union Point was laid out in 1834, when the railroad was extended to that point. The name "Union Point" reflects the fact a railroad junction ("union" of rails) met at the site.

The Georgia General Assembly incorporated Union Point as a city in 1904.

Geography
Union Point is located in eastern Greene County at  (33.616263, -83.073905). U.S. Route 278 passes through the city as Lamb Avenue, leading east  to Crawfordville and west  to Greensboro, the Greene County seat. Georgia State Route 77 leads north  to Lexington and south  to Interstate 20 at Siloam, and State Route 44 leads northeast  to Washington.

Demographics

As of the census of 2000, there were 1,669 people, 651 households, and 421 families residing in the city. The racial makeup of the city was 51.47% White, 46.38% African American, 0.66% Asian, 0.84% from other races, and 0.66% from two or more races. Hispanic or Latino of any race were 2.10% of the population.

There were 651 households, out of which 32.4% had children under the age of 18 living with them, 35.3% were married couples living together, 24.0% had a female householder with no husband present, and 35.3% were non-families. 31.6% of all households were made up of individuals, and 13.5% had someone living alone who was 65 years of age or older. The average household size was 2.46 and the average family size was 3.08.

In the city, the population was spread out, with 26.7% under the age of 18, 9.7% from 18 to 24, 24.9% from 25 to 44, 21.7% from 45 to 64, and 17.0% who were 65 years of age or older. The median age was 37 years. For every 100 females, there were 85.4 males. For every 100 females age 18 and over, there were 77.2 males.

The median income for a household in the city was $26,384, and the median income for a family was $32,284. Males had a median income of $26,484 versus $20,071 for females. The per capita income for the city was $14,715. About 14.0% of families and 18.2% of the population were below the poverty line, including 27.1% of those under age 18 and 13.7% of those age 65 or over.

See also

Jefferson Hall (Union Point, Georgia)
Thornton House (Stone Mountain, Georgia)

References

External links
 City of Union Point official website
 Bethesda Baptist Church historical marker

Cities in Georgia (U.S. state)
Cities in Greene County, Georgia